Petropavlivka is a village in Beryslav Raion, Kherson Oblast, southern Ukraine, about  northeast of the centre of Kherson city. It belongs to the Novooleksandrivka rural hromada, one of the hromadas of Ukraine.

Administrative status 
Until 18 July, 2020, Petropavlivka belonged to Novovorontsovka Raion. The raion was abolished in July 2020 as part of the administrative reform of Ukraine, which reduced the number of raions of Kherson Oblast to five. The area of Novovorontsovka Raion was merged into Beryslav Raion.

Demographics
The native language distribution as of the Ukrainian Census of 2001 was:
 Ukrainian: 96.68%
 Russian: 1.94%
 Armenian: 1.11%
 Moldovan (Romanian): 0.14%

References

Villages in Beryslav Raion